Monika Wołowiec (born February 14, 1976) is a Polish skeleton racer who has competed since 2004. She finished 15th and last in the women's skeleton event at the 2006 Winter Olympics in Turin.

Wolowiec's best finish at the FIBT World Championships was 21st in the women's skeleton event at Calgary in 2005. She lives in Park City, Utah.

References 
 2006 women's skeleton results
 FIBT profile
 Skeletonsport.com profile
 Torino 2006 profile
 Yahoo.com profile for the 2006 Winter Olympics

1976 births
Living people
People from Park City, Utah
Polish female skeleton racers
Skeleton racers at the 2006 Winter Olympics
Olympic skeleton racers of Poland
Place of birth missing (living people)
20th-century Polish women
21st-century Polish women